Horace Eugene Ransom II, better known as Gene Ransom (21 Jan. 1957 - 4 Feb. 2022), was a prominent basketball player for the University of California, Berkeley, Golden Bears from 1975 to 1978. Ransom moved as a young boy from Fresno, California, to Berkeley, where he became a "three-sport legend" at Berkeley High School, excelling in baseball, football, and basketball.

Ransom emulated the basketball style of Berkeley High School basketball stars Phil Chenier, Doug Kagawa, and Carl Shelton. Ransom "shadowed Chenier... trying to pick up on his game."

Ransom averaged 14.8 points per game in his college career, and led Cal's Golden State Bears in assists all three years that he played.
In one game for Cal, Ransom was on the court for all but the final 90 seconds of a five-overtime game against Oregon, ultimately won by the Bears. Ransom played 63 1/2 minutes, which as of 2001 remained the Pac-10 record for most minutes played in a game.

Ransom was inducted into the California Athletics Hall of Fame in 2001.

Later life

After his time as a player, Ransom later served as a basketball coach at Berkeley High School, leading the freshman boys team to a 27-0 record, and served as a youth mentor in other ways. He worked with the nonprofit Athletes United for Peace,  which provided healthy alternatives for youth caught up in street violence. 
With his stepson Jonathon Smith, Ransom also started Dynasty Basketball, an Amateur Athletic Union summer team for promising high school players. As described in the Berkeley Daily Planet in 2002, 

Ransom explained that 

Following the occupation of his father, Ramsom also worked as a longshoreman. Having not completed his degree at the University of California, Berkeley, Ransom eventually completed his undergraduate coursework and obtained a college degree from New College of California.

Death

On Friday, February 4, 2022, at about 5:08pm, Ransom was killed in a freeway shooting in Oakland, California.
 The killing appeared to be a murder motivated by road rage. The freeway was shut down for several hours. A 25 year old man was arrested the next day, and was later charged with murder.

References

1957 births
2022 deaths
California Golden Bears men's basketball players